South County may refer to the following:

Geographic places
South County (Rhode Island), a vernacular name for Washington County, Rhode Island
 South County (Massachusetts), a region of Massachusetts
 South County, a name for the southern part of St. Louis County, Missouri used by residents of the Greater St. Louis area of Missouri and Illinois

Other
South County Airport, an airport in Santa Clara County, California
South County Center, a shopping mall in Mehlville, Missouri
South Dublin (UK Parliament constituency), a county constituency in Ireland from 1885 to 1922
South County Secondary School, a school in Lorton, Virginia